3 Daft Monkeys are a world music-influenced acoustic band from Cornwall, UK, consisting of Tim Ashton, Athene Roberts, Rich Mulryne, and Jamie Graham. The instrumentation consists of vocals, fiddle, twelve-string guitar, bass guitar and percussion.
The band's musical influences include Celtic, Balkan, Romani, Latino, electronic dance, reggae, dub, punk rock, and traditional folk music. 

The band have had great success at venues and festivals all over the UK and Europe, including being invited by Show of Hands to play the main stage at the Eden Project and the 2008 BBC Proms at St David's Hall in Cardiff. Other highlights include GuilFest; Lakefest festival[6]; Folkwoods, Holland; the Glastonbury Festival, the Trowbridge Village Pump Festival; Folk Segovia, Spain; Lorient Interceltic Festival, France; Kevelaer World Music Festival, Germany; Labadoux Festival, Belgium, Buskers Bern Street Festival in Switzerland, and enthusiastically welcomed returns to the Beautiful Days, Bearded Theory, and Larmer Tree festivals.

Throughout the 2000s, the band were a regular support act for The Levellers, with Roberts usually returning to join the Levellers onstage for the finale in a duelling fiddle-off of "What You Know" with added tambourine from Waters and tin-whistle from Ashton.

Between March 2020 and June 2021, the band played over sixty 'Cyberbusks' online due to the various lockdowns and restrictions imposed during the COVID-19 pandemic. Tim and Athene also collaborated with Scott Doonican of The Bar-Steward Sons of Val Doonican on a cover of the Beatles' Being for the Benefit of Mr. Kite!. From July 2021, 3 Daft Monkeys were able to resume touring and played several major festivals including returns to Beautiful Days and Hawkfest.

The band have enjoyed airplay on BBC Radio 2, BBC Radio Ulster, BBC Radio Cornwall, and BBC Radio Wales, and have been described by presenter Mike Harding as "a brilliant band... absolutely amazing".

Line-up changes
The band's first album, Brouhaha, featured Rich Mulryne on djembe, kick drum, cymbals, tambourine and saucepan. From Ooomim onwards Waters played bass. Mulryne rejoined the band as a guest drummer for the album The Antiquated and the Arcane, and has since rejoined as a full member.

In 2011, Lukas Drinkwater joined the band as a temporary replacement for Jamie Waters for the summer tour, and later joined permanently after Waters stepped down. In 2015, Jamie Graham took over playing bass.'Releases

Brouhaha (2000)
Six songs recorded in Cornwall in 2000 with the band's original line-up.
 Wonderful
 3 Daft Monkeys
 Nothing
 Maximillian
 Saturn Returns
 Global Junkie

Ooomim (2002)
Eight songs recorded in Germany, during October 2001 and released in 2002.
 Faces
 Ooomim
 We Be
 Weird-Id
 Crimson Eyes
 Chuffy
 Cheerio
 For the Wedding

Hubbadillia (2004)
Ten songs recorded by Mark Tucker at Presshouse Studios, Devon during the summer of 2004, released December 2004.
 Hubbadillia
 Hey Listen
 Trez Cerveza
 Air
 Astral Eyes
 Bubbles
 The Man
 Stop
 Timeless
 Does My Head In

Gibbon It Live and Dreckly (2007)
12 tracks recorded live at various venues during 2006.
 Broygas Tantz
 Hubbadillia
 Tres Cerveza
 3 Daft Monkeys
 One Fine Day
 Ooomim
 Social Vertigo
 Astral Eyes
 Hey Listen
 Faces
 Maximillian
 Mazoltov

Go Tell the Bees EP (2007)
Showcasing three new tracks from the band's forthcoming album, plus one old favourite.
 Go Tell the Bees [Radio Edit]
 Paranoid Big Brother
 Social Vertigo [Radio Edit]
 Astral Eyes [Remastered]

Social Vertigo (2008)
13 Tracks recorded with Mark Tucker during 2007 at Green Room Studios . Includes guest musicians on cello, brass, and percussion.
 Paranoid Big Brother
 Eyes of Gaia
 Human Nature (Prelude)
 Human Nature
 Go Tell the Bees
 Guardian Angel
 Since
 One Fine Day
 Social Vertigo
 Little Secret
 Let 'Em In
 Monkey & the Slippers
 Dance of the Old Man of Storr

The Antiquated and the Arcane (2010)

 The Antiquated and The Arcane
 Under One Sun
 Just A Ride
 Doors of Perception
 Days of the Dance
 Perfect Stranger
 Time To Evolve
 Casualties of Tour
 Civilised Debauchery
 She Said
 Love (SIC) Fool
 Love Life
 Masquerade Parade (bonus track on downloads only)

Of Stones and Bones (2013)

 Agnes the Giant Killer
 Sarah, the Devil and Jack
 The Lovers of Porthgwarra Cove
 Jenny and the Changeling
 World on its Head
 The Tale of the Laziest Pirate
 Morwenna
 The Pellars of Zennor
 Reverend Hawker of Morwenstow
 One and All
 The Stranger

Year of the Clown (2017)

 Year of the Clown
 Delighted to be Invited
 Drink with God
 Money
 Look to the Stars
 1,000 Years
 I Love You
 Blessings
 Animal
 To Dream of Angels
 Not in my Name
 We are Revolution 

Year of the Cyberbusk (2021)

A limited-edition 2-Disc DVD set chronicling the previous years' series of 'Cyberbusks'. Due to the ongoing COVID-19 pandemic, the band were only able to meet up a handful of times so instead they met up 'online' each Sunday (for over 60 weeks) to play an hour's set. The DVDs contain a compilation of some of the most memorable moments from those sessions plus excerpts from the few outdoor gigs they were able to do together. 

Film appearances
The band played the part of buskers in the Cornish film Darralla Jooan Choy an Horr'' (trans. The Tale of John of Chyannor), winner of the Audience Award at the 2004 Goel Fylm Kernow (Cornwall Film Festival). In 2015, Athene took a role in Tulip Fever, directed by Justin Chadwick.

References

External links

 Official band website
 Spiral Earth Site include interview
 The Source SouthWest Magazine including new interview 
 Properganda Magazine issue #7 with new 3 Daft Monkey interview

English folk musical groups
Musicians from Cornwall